Chemistry.com is an online dating service. It is the sister site of Match.com and was established by the same team that worked for that company. The site's policies involve specifically pairing members for long-term relationships using methods it refers to as "compatibility" and "chemistry".

Chemistry.com's matching algorithm was designed by Dr. Helen Fisher, a professor of anthropology and scholar, and features interviews and contributions from her along with MSN spaces page, "The Great Mate Debate". On January 30, 2009, ABC's 20/20 aired a two-hour special featuring Dr. Fisher and discussing her theory and research behind the Chemistry.com personality test and matching.

The website became notable after several ads portrayed online daters who were rejected by eHarmony, including one which featured a gay man, highlighting the fact that eHarmony will not match people with individuals of the same gender.

In April 2008, Chemistry launched a new set of advertisements signifying the second phase of its long-term strategy, by taking the conventional wedding vows shared between two people and re-inventing them "Chemistry style".

As of June 2013, more than 8 million people across the world have taken the Chemistry.com personality test.

See also
List of online dating websites

References

External links

Match.com

Online dating services of the United States
IAC (company)